"Voce" is a song by Italian rapper and singer Madame. It was released on 3 March 2021 by Sugar Music and was included in her debut album Madame.

The song premiered on the first evening of the Sanremo Music Festival 2021. It ranked eighth at the end of the competition, and was awarded with the "Sergio Bardotti" Award for Best Lyrics and the "Premio Lunezia" for its musical and literary value.

On 13 July 2021, "Voce" won the Targa Tenco for Best Song.

Music video
The music video for "Voce", directed by Attilio Cusani, was released after the Sanremo premiere via Madame's YouTube channel.

Charts

Weekly charts

Year-end charts

Certifications

References

2021 songs
2021 singles
Madame (singer) songs
Sanremo Music Festival songs
Songs written by Dario Faini
Sugar Music singles